Bob Edmond (born 29 December 1948 in Scotland) is a former Australian sportsman who played Australian rules football with Carlton in the Victorian Football League (VFL) during the 1960s and won two Commonwealth Games silver medals in weightlifting.

Although predominantly a defender, Edmond could also play as a ruckman. Like his younger brother Jim, who captained VFL club Footscray, Edmond joined the league from Bairnsdale. He spent just two seasons at Carlton, including their premiership year of 1968, where he made seven appearances but could not break into the finals side.

Edmond represented Australia in the Super Heavyweight division of weightlifting at the 1976 Summer Olympics and finished in seventh position. He then competed at the 1978 Commonwealth Games, also in Canada, winning a silver medal with a lift of 322.5 kg. Edmond finally competed at the 1982 Brisbane Commonwealth Games and again finished with the silver, with the gold going to fellow Australian Dean Lukin.

References

External links

Holmesby, Russell and Main, Jim (2007). The Encyclopedia of AFL Footballers. 7th ed. Melbourne: Bas Publishing.

1948 births
Living people
VFL/AFL players born outside Australia
Australian rules footballers from Victoria (Australia)
Carlton Football Club players
Bairnsdale Football Club players
Australian male weightlifters
Weightlifters at the 1978 Commonwealth Games
Weightlifters at the 1982 Commonwealth Games
Commonwealth Games silver medallists for Australia
Weightlifters at the 1976 Summer Olympics
Olympic weightlifters of Australia
Scottish emigrants to Australia
Commonwealth Games medallists in weightlifting
Medallists at the 1978 Commonwealth Games
Medallists at the 1982 Commonwealth Games